The Freedom Fighters is a superhero team appearing in American comic books published by DC Comics. The original six characters were the Black Condor, Doll Man, the Human Bomb, the Ray, the Phantom Lady, and Uncle Sam. Although the characters were created by Quality Comics, they never were gathered in a group before being acquired by DC. The team first appeared in a Justice League of America/Justice Society of America team-up, which ran in Justice League of America #107–108 (October–December 1973), written by Len Wein and drawn by Dick Dillin. Their own ongoing series premiered with Freedom Fighters #1 (April 1976), written by Gerry Conway and Martin Pasko, and drawn by Ric Estrada.

Fictional team history

Although when the Freedom Fighters appeared for the first time in Justice League of America #107–108, they were considered natives from Earth-X, retroactive stories established the group as native from Earth-Two, who migrated to Earth-X.

The earliest version of the Freedom Fighters was assembled on December 7, 1941. Uncle Sam brought them together, assembling Neon the Unknown, Magno, the Red Torpedo, the Invisible Hood, Miss America and the Hourman to prevent a tragedy. However, this group failed in its attempt to stop the devastation at Pearl Harbor. All of them but Uncle Sam and Hourman were originally thought killed, but only Magno actually died. This version of the group was a retcon and their battle and alleged deaths were depicted in the pages of Roy Thomas' two books chronicling that era: All-Star Squadron and the Young All-Stars.

The DC versions of the characters were said to reside on the parallel world of "Earth-X", where Nazi Germany eventually won a prolonged World War II due to a Japanese invasion of California and the development of nuclear weapons by the Nazis.

The Freedom Fighters had their own book for 15 issues from 1976 to 1978, in which they crossed over to Earth-1 and were quickly set up by the Silver Ghost. They spend the rest of the series on the run from the law, unable to clear themselves. The series was cancelled before the storyline concluded; it was intended to be completed in issues #16-18 of Secret Society of Super Villains, but that series, too, was cancelled before the story could be published. This series also introduced the Crusaders and reintroduced Firebrand.

In addition to the core members of the "second team" which were the members seen in the 1970s comic book, other Quality heroes joined later: the Red Bee, Miss America, the Manhunter, Plastic Man, and Quicksilver.

Following the Crisis on Infinite Earths, the Freedom Fighters were based on the main DC Universe Earth and were all members of the All-Star Squadron.

Years after the war, a third version of the team surfaced in the 1980s, with the rise of a new age of heroes. The Freedom Fighters, along with the Blackhawks and Justice Society, were captured by alien Appellaxians and placed in internment camps. They were freed by the new Justice League of America.

The Freedom Fighters regrouped for a brief time, but soon called it quits again when Firebrand was killed in battle with the Silver Ghost.

A fourth version of the team appeared as an auxiliary of the new Justice Society of America. The Human Bomb, the Black Condor, and the Phantom Lady were later killed by the Secret Society of Super Villains in Infinite Crisis #1. Damage was critically injured, Iron Munro was absent, and the Ray was captured by the Psycho-Pirate as part of Alexander Luthor's plans.

Uncle Sam and the Freedom Fighters
A new team of heroes debuted in the limited series Crisis Aftermath: The Battle for Blüdhaven, and later featured as Freedom Fighters members in the miniseries Uncle Sam and the Freedom Fighters, which premiered in July 2006. This team consists of new incarnations of the Phantom Lady, the Ray (Stan Silver), the Human Bomb, Doll Man, Bigfoot, the Destroyer and the Face. It is part of S.H.A.D.E., a secret American government agency chartered under the USA PATRIOT Act, led by Father Time. The new team conducts assassinations and other illegal acts against criminal and terrorist organizations. As issue #1 of Uncle Sam and the Freedom Fighters begins, the team is tasked to capture the revived Uncle Sam, who is in the process of forming his own Freedom Fighters team; Sam subsequently recruits the S.H.A.D.E. members to his cause, openly disapproving of their use of deadly force (although they continue to kill people, even under Uncle Sam's guidance).

This version of the team is loosely based on notes by Grant Morrison and written by Jimmy Palmiotti and Justin Gray. Uncle Sam is portrayed as an almost Christ-like figure, returning from the dead, with the new Firebrand filling a John the Baptist role. Father Time is shown as aiding in Senator Frank Knight's being secretly murdered in the midst of his successful campaign for the Presidency of the U.S. and replaced by a sentient robot double, Gonzo the Mechanical Bastard, who proceeds with an agenda to implant RFID chips in every U.S. citizen by law and control them to bring chaos to the world through war.

In Uncle Sam and the Freedom Fighters #3, a team created by Father Time called First Strike attacked the Freedom Fighters, but not before being stopped by the new Black Condor.

In issue #4, the Black Condor manages to weaken First Strike long enough for the Freedom Fighters to fight back. The Human Bomb kills one of First Strike's members, Propaganda, and the team heads back to S.H.A.D.E. headquarters.

In issue #5, the Freedom Fighters defeat First Strike, but are taken out by a young woman claiming to be Miss America. While they are being tortured, S.H.A.D.E. headquarters is attacked by a new Red Bee and an old woman claiming to be the real Miss America.

In issue #6, the Freedom Fighters defeat the new Miss America with the original's help, forcing Father Time to retreat. As he begins "molting" into a new body, he gives the order to "activate the traitor."  This turns out to be the Ray, who attacks and kills the new Invisible Hood and calls down giant reinforcements.

In issue #7, The Freedom Fighters face off against the Cosmigods, as Uncle Sam calls them. In the midst of the battle, the traitorous Ray is confronted by the returning Ray Terrill. As predicted, Gonzo turns on the newly rejuvenated Father Time, who proceeds to give Uncle Sam the evidence to prove Gonzo's true identity. Sam presents the evidence to the world, and seemingly the final battle between First Strike and the Freedom Fighters begins.

In issue #8, the Freedom Fighters engage in battle against Gonzo's metahuman taskforce at the Washington Monument and quickly gain support from the civilians. The public eye are now seeing them as real heroes, which was later revealed to be part of Father Time's plan all along. He tricked Gonzo into believing that S.H.A.D.E was against Uncle Sam, while in truth he was preparing the Freedom Fighters to help combat a major threat in the future. Father Time captures Gonzo and turns him into an 'Orphan Box' in the shape of a pair of spectacles. He plans to use it against Gonzo's creator, the Shadow Demons. All of the metahuman taskforce members disappear into the timestream, along with Father Time, shortly thereafter. A week later, the new President appoints the Freedom Fighters the new directors of S.H.A.D.E.

Further adventures
In Countdown #38, the Freedom Fighters are seen trying to stop an unplanned nuclear missile launch, initiated by the Calculator.

In the new Freedom Fighters miniseries written by Justin Gray and Jimmy Palmiotti in 2007, the Red Bee is captured by an alien insect swarm and transformed into a human/insect hybrid. At the same time, S.H.A.D.E. has planned to make the Freedom Fighters into media darlings to help increase faith in the government following the Amazonian incident.

Uncle Sam, Firebrand, Doll Man, and the Human Bomb refuse to go along with the plan and return to the Heartland. For a time, the remaining Freedom Fighters become celebrities, part of a new group called the Crusaders. The Red Bee later collapses in her apartment and a swarm of insects suddenly rise out of her body.

The Phantom Lady, unable to cope with the media attention, goes on a binge spree, culminating in her drunkenly slicing a criminal in half on national television. Stormy is brought to the heartland, where her body is cleaned of toxins by Miss America.

Uncle Sam and Doll Man recruit the original Doll Man (Darrell Dane) from a micro-environment within the Pentagon. After the head of the Crusaders program, Robbins, tries to kill the Red Bee, the Freedom Fighters confront him. It is revealed that Robbins has mental powers that he used to control the Crusaders — and Stormy — leading to her binge.

While the Crusaders and Freedom Fighters battle, the Red Bee is overtaken by her insectoid side, uses her pheromones to enslave the Crusaders and the Freedom Fighters, and prepares to create a "hive" on Earth. Meanwhile, an attempt to cure the Doll Men and several other micro-sized individuals goes horribly wrong, as all of them are merged into a single mutant form. The mutant goes on a rampage until Emma Thompson reaches Lester. The Red Bee is cured of her affliction by Langford "Happy" Terrill, who had gained the powers of Neon the Unknown. The team then prepares to fight off an invasion by the insectoids. After their victory, the group go their separate ways, but Uncle Sam declares that they will be needed when the Crisis begins.

Blackest Night
In the Blackest Night crossover event, Black Lantern power rings are shown heading toward the graves of the Phantom Lady, the Black Condor, and the Human Bomb, presumably to revive them for use in the interstellar revenant army being assembled. Indeed, at least those three are seen later attacking JSA headquarters, along with the undead revenants of the Society's members. These three Black Lanterns, along with Al Pratt's undead form, focus on attacking Damage, though they have little success, continually getting blown up, regenerating and rising again to attack him, until Jean Loring's revenant kills him.

Ongoing series

A new ongoing Freedom Fighters series began in September 2010. However, it was cancelled after only nine issues.

The New 52
In September 2011, The New 52 rebooted DC's continuity. In this new timeline, the Freedom Fighters still inhabit Earth-10, but according to Grant Morrison's Multiversity revision of the concept, Kal-L landed in German territory in 1938. Hitler reverse-engineered the alien technology that the Kryptonian starship incorporated and released Kal-L/Overman on American forces in the 1950s, which enabled Nazi Germany to win the Second World War. However, Overman became aware of the evil of his comrades after seeing the massive numbers of deaths of innocent people who did not fit into the Nazi ideology. After Hitler died, Overman and his government were able to establish a utopia. The Freedom Fighters still exist as a team of genetically enhanced metahumans, thanks to the genius of the Earth-10 Dr. Sivana, but in revised and inclusive composition (the Ray is gay, Doll Man is a Jehovah's Witness, the Black Condor is an African-American, and the Phantom Lady is Romani). The Freedom Fighters commit various acts of terrorism against Overman's post-Nazi regime while Overman is in conflict with himself, as he still feels guilt over the ethnic and ideological purges of the Hitler era. In the Freedom Fighters' most extreme attack, they drop the Earth-10's Justice League orbital base on Metropolis, killing millions of people and even further grieving Overman.

DC Rebirth
New Super-Man features a group called the Freedom Fighters of China. Each member of the group is a Chinese version of one of the original Freedom Fighters. They are led by the Flying Dragon General (an analog of Uncle Sam); other members include the Sunbeam (an analog of the Ray), the Blue Condor (an analog of the Black Condor), the Ghost Woman (an analog of the Phantom Lady), Folding Paper Man (an analog of Plastic Man), and the Human Firecracker (an analog of the Human Bomb).

Other versions
 In the final issue of 52, a new Multiverse is revealed, consisting of 52 realities. Among the parallel realities shown is one designated "Earth-10", X being the Roman numeral for 10. This new alternate Earth differs from the original Pre-Crisis Earth-X. In original continuity, the Freedom Fighters were the only metahumans on the original Earth-X. However, the new Earth-10 is premised on the continued ascendancy of Nazi Germany, which was defeated in the original JLA/JSA/Freedom Fighters crossover. Earth-10 is home to the JL-Axis, which consists of Nazi counterparts of the Justice League, who combat an alternate version of the Freedom Fighters. Prefigured by comments by Grant Morrison, this alternate universe is not the Pre-Crisis Earth-X, which renders these new characters unrelated to previous versions.
 In the WildStorm miniseries The Authority: Revolution, the initial protagonists are a group called the "Sons of Liberty", a superpatriot group of the 1940s and 1950s. They consist of Paul Revere (super-strength and "broadcast empath"), Minute-Maid (super-strength), Johnny Rocketman (supersonic flight), the Human Hand-Grenade (with the power to shrink, explode, and re-constitute his own body), and Fallout (a man with undefined nuclear powers who wears a shroud). The group is a pastiche of the Freedom Fighters.
 In the DC Comics universe, the "Sons of Liberty" were a paramilitary group that funded Agent Liberty.
 In Countdown Presents: The Search for Ray Palmer - Superwoman/Batwoman #1, written by Freedom Fighters writers Justin Gray and Jimmy Palmiotti, Earth-11 was revealed to be an Earth home to gender-reversed versions of the heroes of New Earth. Among them were the Freedom Fighters, consisting of female versions of the Ray, the Human Bomb, the Black Condor, and, strangely, Etrigan the Demon, as well as a male version of the Phantom Lady named the Phantom Man. They are led by Columbia, a female version of Uncle Sam.
 In an alternate timeline featured in The All-New Booster Gold #8, a group calling themselves the Freedom Fighters exists. It consists of Hawkman, the Green Arrow, Anthro, the Wild Dog, and Pantha.
 In "Time of Crisis", the Crisis on Infinite Earths homage module for Mutants & Masterminds, the Übermenschen team is composed of analogues of the original Freedom Fighters.
 All of the original Freedom Fighters besides Uncle Sam and many later or honorary members make cameo appearances in The Golden Age (comics), attending a rally where superheroes are summoned to pledge allegiance to their country. When the villain of the story reveals himself, Black Condor and the Ray are among the first to engage him in battle after one of his accomplices murders Miss America, but they are easily knocked out. Human Bomb lasts longer, but he and Doll Man are both apparently killed in the battle. Red Bee also dies in the battle while it is unclear whether Phantom Lady, Jester, Quicksilver, Alias the Spider, or Red Torpedo participate in the melee.
The Freedom Fighters inspired the Marvel Comics superhero team the Crusaders. The character associations are: Captain Wings and the Black Condor; Dyna-Mite and Doll Man; Ghost Girl and the Phantom Lady; the Spirit of '76 and Uncle Sam; Thunder Fist and the Human Bomb; and Tommy Lightning and the Ray. At the same time that the Invaders were meeting the Crusaders in Marvel Comics, the Freedom Fighters were also facing off against a team called the Crusaders, with the DC version of the Crusaders based upon Marvel Comics' Invaders (several of the Crusaders that fought the Freedom Fighters were really "comic book fans" named "Lennie" (Len Wein), "Marvin" (Marv Wolfman), "Arch" (Archie Goodwin), and "Roy" (Roy Thomas), as shown in Freedom Fighters #9).

In other media

Television 
The original Freedom Fighters appear in the Batman: The Brave and the Bold episode "Cry Freedom Fighters!", consisting of Uncle Sam, Doll Man, the Human Bomb, the Ray, the Phantom Lady, and the Black Condor.

Arrowverse
A contemporary variation of the Freedom Fighters appear in media set in the Arrowverse. A majority of this version of the group hail from Earth-X, an alternate reality where the Nazis won World War II and took over the world, and serves as a resistance movement against them in their present.
 The group first appears in the live-action crossover "Crisis on Earth-X", led by General Winn Schott and consisting of the Ray, Citizen Cold, Guardian, and Red Tornado. They develop an interdimensional gateway and allow the New Reichsmen take control of it in an attempt to trap them on another Earth. However, heroes from Earth-1 and Earth-38 halt the plan after they were taken prisoner and brought to Earth-X before defeating the New Reichsmen on Earth-1. Afterwards, Ray and Cold establish an alliance with the Earth-1 and 38 heroes to defeat the New Reichsmen's remnants. As of the live-action TV series The Flash episode "Fury Rogue", the Freedom Fighters have begun rebuilding Earth-X and continue fighting to suppress the aforementioned remnants. In the comic book tie-in for the crossover "Crisis on Infinite Earths", the Freedom Fighters and Allies started World War III while fighting the Axis Powers.
 The Freedom Fighters appear in the CW Seed animated web series Freedom Fighters: The Ray, consisting of the Black Condor, the Phantom Lady, Doll Man, the Red Tornado, and the Ray.

Miscellaneous
The original Freedom Fighters appeared in Justice League Unlimited #17, consisting of Uncle Sam, Doll Man, the Human Bomb, the Phantom Lady, the Ray, and the Black Condor. This version of the group works for a contemporary, rogue U.S. government agency.

See also
 The Crusaders

References

External links
 Freedom Fighters at DC Comics Database
 The Freedom Fighters at Don Markstein's Toonopedia. Archived from the original on July 30, 2016.
 Comic Book Urban Legends – Freedom Fighters
 Freedom Fighters bio and timeline 
 Index to the Freedom Fighters' 1970s adventures
 Cosmic Teams – Freedom Fighters

1976 comics debuts
Characters created by Dick Dillin
Characters created by Len Wein
Comics characters introduced in 1973
DC Comics superhero teams
DC Comics titles
United States-themed superheroes
Fictional revolutionaries